The Inman Mills, now the Lofts at Inman Mills, are a historic textile mill complex at 240 4th Street in Inman, South Carolina.  The mill complex includes a large main mill building and a number of smaller buildings, some attached, as well as a smokestack.  The main building is a large rectangular four-story brick building with largely bricked-over segmented-arch window bays, and a five-story central tower.  The mill was built in 1902 for the Chapman family, and was designed by the prominent regional mill architect W.B. Smith Whately.  The mill was closed in 2001, and was for many years one of the city's major employers.

The mills were listed on the National Register of Historic Places in 2016.

See also
National Register of Historic Places listings in Spartanburg County, South Carolina

References

External links 
 Inman Mills corporate site

Textile mills in South Carolina
Industrial buildings and structures on the National Register of Historic Places in South Carolina
Buildings and structures in Spartanburg, South Carolina
National Register of Historic Places in Spartanburg, South Carolina
Cotton mills in the United States
Apartment buildings in South Carolina